A statue of Edward W. Carmack was installed in Nashville, Tennessee, United States in 1924. The statue was the work of American sculptor Nancy Cox-McCormack. Carmack was an opponent of Ida B. Wells and encouraged retaliation for her support of the civil rights movement.

History
Carmack — formerly a US Senator — was shot and killed on November 9, 1908, by Duncan Brown Cooper and son, Robin Cooper. Both were tried & convicted of murder, then pardoned by Governor Ham Patterson; in 1909, the Tennessee legislature provided for the creation of a memorial sculpture of him by Nancy Cox-McCormack, to be placed on the grounds of the Capitol. It was erected in 1927.

The monument was toppled by demonstrators during the George Floyd protests in 2020.

See also

 List of monuments and memorials removed during the George Floyd protests

References

1927 sculptures
Buildings and structures in Nashville, Tennessee
Monuments and memorials in Tennessee
Monuments and memorials removed during the George Floyd protests
Outdoor sculptures in Tennessee
Sculptures of men in Tennessee
Statues in Tennessee
Vandalized works of art in Tennessee
Statues removed in 2020